is a municipality in Innlandet county, Norway. It is located in the traditional district of Hadeland. The administrative centre of the municipality is the village of Jaren. Other villages in Gran include Bjoneroa, Brandbu, Egge, Gran, and Ringstad.

The  municipality is the 148th largest by area out of the 356 municipalities in Norway. Gran is the 88th most populous municipality in Norway with a population of 13,633.

General information

The prestegjeld of Gran was established as a municipality on 1 January 1838 (see formannskapsdistrikt law). On 1 January 1874, an unpopulated area of Gran Municipality was transferred to the neighboring Jevnaker Municipality. On 1 January 1897, the municipality was divided into two. The northern part of the municipality (population: 4,719) became the new municipality of Brandbu and the southern part of the municipality (population: 3,897) remained as Gran municipality. During the 1960s, there were many municipal mergers across Norway due to the work of the Schei Committee. On 1 January 1962, the Furulund area of Gran on the west side of the lake Randsfjorden (population: 180) was transferred to the neighboring Jevnaker Municipality. Also on that date, the remaining part of Gran (population: 5,249) was merged with Brandbu Municipality (population: 6,477) to form a new, larger Gran Municipality. On 1 January 1964, the part of Gran located at the south end of the lake Einavatnet (population: 12) was transferred to the neighboring Vestre Toten Municipality.

Name
The municipality (originally the parish) is named after the old Gran farm since the first church was built there. The name is identical with the word  which means "spruce tree".

Coat of arms
The coat of arms was granted on 11 December 1987. The official blazon is "In Gules, two points ending in a cross bottony in Or". This means the arms have a red field (background) and the charge is two triangles stretching upwards with a bottony cross on the tip of each triangle. The triangles and crosses have a tincture of Or which means they are colored yellow most of the time, but if they are made out of metal, then gold is used. The triangles and crosses were meant to represent the spires of the medieval Sister Churches which are located in the municipality. The arms were designed by Kari Ruud Flem from Jevnaker.

Churches
The Church of Norway has four parishes within the municipality of Gran. It is part of the Hadeland og Land prosti (deanery) in the Diocese of Hamar.

History

Granavollen is the site of the Sister Churches. These two stone churches are from the Middle Ages and were constructed side by side. The smaller and older is the Mariakirke, a single nave church built in the Romanesque style, built sometime before 1150.  The neighbouring Nikolaikirke is a three-aisled basilica, probably inspired by the construction of the St. Halvardskirke in Oslo. It was built sometime between 1150 and 1200. According to local folklore, the churches were built by two sisters. These two detested each other so much they could not share the same church. A more likely explanation however, is that the Mariakirke was built for the local congregation, while the Nikolaikirke was the main church for Hadeland parish. The Granavollen stone is located behind the Nikolaikirken.

The Old Tingelstad Church (Tingelstad St.Petri Kirke) is another medieval stone church. It is a Romanesque stone church, dated to the 12th century and dedicated to St.Peter.  This church has survived even though it has not been in regular use for some 140 years.

This is also the location of Hadeland Folkemuseum with a collection of buildings from the area, farm implements, a grave mound from the Viking Era, and a replica of the 11th century Dynna Runestone (Dynnasteinen). It also holds an archive of photographs and documents.

Economy
Health care spending represents about one-third of the total municipal budget, which is 7.5% higher than the average for Norway. The Norwegian National Road 4 runs through the most populated parts of Gran, bringing lots of transportation traffic.

Geography

Gran is part of the Hadeland region. It is bordered to the north by the municipalities of Søndre Land and Vestre Toten (in Innlandet county), to the east by Hurdal and Nannestad, to the south by Lunner and Jevnaker, and to the west by Ringerike. There are several lakes in Gran including Øyangen, Randsfjorden, and Vestre Bjonevatnet.

Government
All municipalities in Norway, including Gran, are responsible for primary education (through 10th grade), outpatient health services, senior citizen services, unemployment and other social services, zoning, economic development, and municipal roads. The municipality is governed by a municipal council of elected representatives, which in turn elect a mayor.

Municipal council
The municipal council  of Gran is made up of 27 representatives that are elected to four year terms.  The party breakdown of the municipal council is as follows:

Mayor
The mayors of Gran (incomplete list):

1837-1839: Carl Jacob Bergh
1856-1861: Amund Larsen Gulden
1864-1867: Amund Larsen Gulden
1945-1946: Olaf Prestsæter (Bp)
1946-1948: Paul A. Grini (Bp)
1948-1951: Axel Moger (Ap)
1952-1954: Lars Skovly (Ap)
1955-1956: Axel Bråten (Ap)
1956-1959: Torgrim Dynna (Bp)
1960-1961: Kristian Torgalsen (Ap)
1962-1965: Jens Røisli (Ap)
1966-1970: Alf Skovly (Ap)
1970-1979: Gunnar Sagbakken (Ap)
1980-1995: Lars Arne Høydal (Ap)
1996–2005: Rigmor Aasrud (Ap)
2005-2007: Roald Braathen (Ap)
2007-2011: Inger Staxrud (LL)
2011-2015: Knut Magnar Lehre (Ap)
2015–2019: Willy Westhagen (LL)
2019–present: Randi Eek Thorsen (Ap)

Sister cities
Gran has sister city agreements with the following places:
  - Favrskov, Region Midtjylland, Denmark
  - Kungsbacka, Halland County, Sweden
  - Lugazi, Kampala District, Uganda
  - Mukono, Mukono District, Uganda
  - Pärnu, Pärnu County, Estonia
  - Saarijärvi, Länsi-Suomi, Finland

Notable people 

 Cally Monrad (1879 in Gran – 1950) a Norwegian singer, actress and poet 
 Hans Stenseth (1896 in Gran – 1994) a leading Norwegian flautist
 Kristian Horn (1903 in Brandbu – 1981) a Norwegian botanist, academic and humanist
 Kirsten Langbo (1909 in Gran – 1996) a children's writer, singer-songwriter and entertainer
 Ulla-Mari Brantenberg (born 1947) a Norwegian glass artist, lives in Brandbu
 Espen Reinertsen (born 1979 in Gran) a saxophonist, flutist, composer and music producer

Sport 
 Sverre Fredheim (1907 in Gan – 1981) an American Olympic skier
 Torstein Seiersten (born 1931 in Brandbu) a retired speed skater, competed at the 1956 & 1960 Winter Olympics
 Trond-Arne Bredesen (born 1967 in Gran) a Nordic combined skier, competed at the 1988 Winter Olympics

References

External links

Municipal fact sheet from Statistics Norway *
Official website of Gran 
Hadeland Folkemuseum 
Raukr Viking Centre

 
Hadeland
Municipalities of Innlandet
1838 establishments in Norway